Hiiumaa is the second largest island in Estonia and is part of the West Estonian archipelago, in the Baltic Sea. It has an area of 989 km2 and is 22 km from the Estonian mainland. Its largest town is Kärdla. It is located within Hiiu County.

Names 
In modern Finnish, it is called , literally 'Hiisi's Land'.

History

Prehistory 
Hiiumaa emerged from the Baltic Sea 8500 years ago due to isostatic uplift after the retreat of the ice cap. Mesolithic settlements are found on the island's Kõpu Peninsula from about 5500 BC. These settlements seem to be related mostly to seal hunting and extend into the earliest Neolithic. As Hiiumaa is constantly uplifting the local sea level was 20 m higher than today at this time. For this reason these settlements are located far from the modern coastline. The pottery found at these sites is of the Narva Type and is similar to that found on Saaremaa and the Estonian mainland.

A series of stone-cist graves are also present on the island from the Late Bronze Age through to the Late Iron Age.

Crusades 
The first documented record of the island of Dageida was made by contemporary chroniclers in 1228, when Hiiumaa and the rest of Estonia were conquered by Germanic crusaders. In 1254, Hiiumaa was divided between the Bishopric of Ösel-Wiek and the Livonian branch of the Teutonic Order, acting partly on behalf of the Hanseatic League.

Swedish and Russian era 

The island was part of Swedish Estonia from 1563 to 1721, after which it passed to the Russian Empire as part of the Governorate of Estonia, though Dagö's Swedish population kept most of their privileges. Most of the island's previously numerous Swedish-speaking population emigrated or were "Estonianised" during the period of Imperial Russian rule, although a minority remained until the 20th century. Estonian Swedes are also known as aibofolke ("the island people" in the local Swedish) or rannarootslased ("coastal Swedes" in Estonian). Administratively the island of Hiiumaa belonged to Lääne County.

World War I
Hiiumaa was occupied during World War I by the Imperial German Army, in Operation Albion. After the war, in 1918, it became a part of independent Estonia.

World War II
The waters near Hiiumaa were active during World War II:

 23 June 1941- The Soviet destroyer Gnevny was sunk by a German seamine.
 25 June- the Soviet minesweeper T-208 Shkiv was destroyed by a German seamine.
 27 June- Two German motor torpedo boats, S43 and S106, were destroyed by Soviet seamines.
 1 July- the Soviet submarine M-81 was destroyed by a German seamine north of Hiiumaa.
 7 July- the Soviet minesweeper T-216 was sunk.
 30 July- the Soviet minesweeper T-201 Zarjad was sunk.
 10 August- the German submarine  was sunk by a torpedo from the Soviet submarine SC-307.
 Hiiumaa Island was occupied by the Stalinist Soviet Union in 1940, by Nazi Germany in 1941, and by the USSR again in 1944. 

Hiiumaa remained under Soviet control until Estonia regained independence in August 1991. During the period of Soviet occupation 1944-1991, Hiiumaa was declared a restricted zone, closed to foreigners and to most mainland Estonians.  A number of derelict Soviet forts and communication towers are still present on the island's northern coast.

Natural environment

Hiiumaa is an island in Estonia located north of Saaremaa in the Baltic Sea. It is the northernmost island in the Muhu archipelago, which includes Saaremaa and Muhu. Hiiumaa has a low relief (up to 68 m above sea level) and is mostly formed of limestone, that is exposed in cliffs around parts of the island's coast. In the North of the island there are a series of fossilized beaches preserved as uplift has occurred. The modern beaches are primarily on the northern and western coast lines. The natural environment is protected within the Tahkuna Nature Reserve and West Estonian Archipelago Biosphere Reserve.

The Hiiu Shoal (Nekmangrund) is located off the northwestern shore of Hiiumaa Island. The Soela Strait separates Hiiumaa from Saaremaa to its south, and the Muhu Strait separates it from the mainland of Estonia.

Ecology 
The fauna and flora of Hiiumaa are similar to the Estonian mainland. The mammal fauna includes elk, red deer, roe deer, wild boars, foxes, lynxes and martens. Wolves have recently started to repopulate the island after being made locally extinct. 
Minks were also reintroduced in 2000, after they were exterminated by trappers. Since the end of the 1990s the island shelters a conservation project aimed at restoring populations of European mink, an endangered species of which there is about only 1,000 individual specimens left in Europe as of 2017. This project started with removing from the island all American minks that had escaped from breeding farms, and reintroducing some European minks. The latter started breeding.

The bird species found on the island include black storks, golden eagles, cranes, avocets and swans. The forests are dominated by pine and deciduous trees, the rest of the uncultivated land is covered by swamps and dunes. The island has about 1000 species of large plants of which 50 are protected.

Geology 
The exposed geology of Hiiumaa is composed of Paleozoic limestone which dips towards the South, covered by glacial sediments. In the North of the island the limestones are Ordovician and they young upwards to the Silurian in the South. These limestones formed at 30 degrees South and have since been moving North with the rest of the Estonian block. Bore holes have found Cambrian sedimentary rocks and a crystalline basement.

In the Ordovician (c. 455 million years ago) the sea floor was hit by a meteorite forming the 4 km wide Kärdla impact structure. This structure was then filled with Paleozoic sediment. It located about 4 km west-southwest of Kärdla and is barely visible in the modern geomorphology. The crater is well preserved at depth, with a clear rim, breccia and minerals and rocks formed from the heat and pressure of the impact.

The limestone is overlain by Pleistocene glacial deposits that were deposited as the ice cap retreated 11 to 12 thousand years ago. These include terminal moraines, the two most prominent being one in the South of Island running towards the North-East and another forming the Kõpu Peninsula.

Climate

Towns and buildings
The island has several villages, as well a small town of Kärdla (pop. 3,287) and small boroughs of Käina and Kõrgessaare. The oldest surviving church was built in Pühalepa in 1259, though it was rebuilt in the 18th century. The Hanseatic League built a lighthouse in Kõpu near the start of the 16th century. It is the third oldest continuously operating lighthouse in the world.

Employment and land-use 
The island’s economy is mostly tourism, livestock, farming, wrecking, fishing, and fish processing. The tourism is mostly seasonal.

Hiiumaa council agrees to the construction of a wind farm. Recently there has been a trend towards smaller farms and more tourism

Transport
Road transport from Estonian mainland to Hiiumaa involves a 90-minute (28 km) ferry crossing from Rohuküla to Heltermaa, which is 25 km by road from Kärdla. There are up to 10 ferry departures a day operated by TS Laevad. In the summer weekends, getting car space on the ferry usually requires advance booking. There are about 2 scheduled buses a day between Tallinn (the capital of Estonia) and Kärdla.
In the winter, the island can be reached, conditions permitting, via a 26.5 km ice road (the longest in Europe) across the frozen Baltic Sea. A bridge to the mainland of Estonia has been occasionally proposed.

Hiiumaa is served by Kärdla Airport, with regular flights to Tallinn. Bicycle rental is also available in Kärdla and there is a good bicycle path built from Kärdla towards Kõrgessaare.

Culture and politics 

The island is part of the B7 Network, a loose grouping of the major islands of the Baltic Sea. Smoked cooked plaice is a traditional summertime delicacy. There is a friendly rivalry with the neighboring island of Saaremaa.

Notable people

Juhan Maaker (1845–1930), Estonian folk musician
Rudolf Tobias (1873–1918), Estonian composer
Marie Under (1883–1980), Estonian poet, nominated for the Nobel Prize in Literature several times
Roman von Ungern-Sternberg (1885–1921), Russian White military commander in the Russian Civil War
Aleksander Maaker (1890–1968), the last traditional player of the torupill (Estonian bagpipe)
Lydia Mei (1896–1965), Estonian artist
Ivan Triesault (1898–1980), Estonian-American actor
Natalie Mei (1900–1975), Estonian artist
Elmar Tampõld (1920–2013), Estonian-Canadian architect
Ülo Sooster (1924–1970), Estonian artist 
Ave Alavainu (1942–2022), Estonian poet
Erkki-Sven Tüür (b. 1959), Estonian composer of contemporary classical music
Heiki Nabi (b. 1985), Estonian Olympic champion Greco-Roman wrestler

Image gallery

See also

List of islands of Estonia
List of islands in the Baltic Sea
Estonian Swedes

References

External links

Hiiumaa County government Official site

Pictures of Coastal batteries World War I and World War II in Hiiumaa Official site

Estonian islands in the Baltic
Landforms of Hiiu County
Kreis Wiek